The women's tournament of rugby sevens at the 2015 Pan American Games was held in Toronto, Ontario, Canada from July 11 to 12. The rugby sevens competition was held at BMO Field, although due to naming rights, the venue was known as Exhibition Stadium for the duration of the games. Women's rugby sevens was making its debut in the Pan American Games. A total of six teams competed in the tournament.

Qualification
A total of six women's teams qualified to compete at the games (12 athletes per team).

Medallists

Tournament

Preliminary stage

Pool Play

Fifth Place Game

Bronze Medal Game

Gold Medal Game

Final ranking

References

Women's tournament
2015 in women's rugby union
International women's rugby union competitions hosted by Canada